The 1944 Columbia Lions football team was an American football team that represented Columbia University as an independent during the 1944 college football season. 

In their 15th season under head coach Lou Little, the Lions compiled a 2–6 record, and were outscored 125 to 71 by opponents. George Gilberg was the team captain.  

Columbia played its home games at Baker Field in Upper Manhattan, in New York City.

Schedule

References

Columbia
Columbia Lions football seasons
Columbia Lions football